Roselite is a rare arsenate mineral with chemical formula: . It was first described in 1825 for an occurrence in the Rappold mines of Schneeberg, Saxony, Germany and named by Armand Lévy after German mineralogist Gustav Rose. It occurs in cobalt bearing hydrothermal environments and was associated with veins of quartz and chalcedony in the type locality. It has also been reported from Italy, Morocco, Chile, British Columbia and several locations in Germany.

The pleochroism of roselite depends on chemical composition with darker rose colored varieties being higher in cobalt content and lighter rose colored varieties are higher in calcium and magnesium content (Palache et al., 1960). This gives rise to two different pleochroism schemes, one for dark rose and one for light rose. Dark rose varieties have X: dark rose, Y: pale rose, Z: paler rose. Light rose varieties have X: pale rose, Y: paler rose, Z: palest rose.

References

Bibliography
Palache, P.; Berman H.; Frondel, C. (1960). "Dana's System of Mineralogy, Volume II: Halides, Nitrates, Borates, Carbonates, Sulfates, Phosphates, Arsenates, Tungstates, Molybdates, Etc. (Seventh Edition)" John Wiley and Sons, Inc., New York, pp. 723-725.

Cobalt minerals
Arsenate minerals
Magnesium minerals
Monoclinic minerals
Minerals in space group 14